The 1937 Campeonato Nacional de Fútbol Profesional was Chilean first tier’s 5th season. Colo-Colo were the champions, achieving their first ever title.

Scores

Standings

Topscorer

References

External links
ANFP 
RSSSF Chile 1937

Primera División de Chile seasons
Primera
Chile